TextGrid is a research group with the goal of supporting access to and the exchange of information in the humanities and social sciences with the help of modern information technology (the grid).

The project is funded by the Federal Ministry of Education and Research (Germany). TextGrid is one project within the D-Grid initiative and part of WissGrid.

Project phases 

The TextGrid project started in February 2006. During the first phase of the project the development of the software begun. In consequence an infrastructure for the virtual research environment was built. During the second project phase (June 2009 to May 2012) a productive version of the software was created and the user base was broadened. Meanwhile, the project reached its third funding phase (June 2012 to May 2015) entitled "TextGrid - Virtual Research Environment for the Humanities". The objective within this phase is the transformation of the project for the continuous operation in financial, legal and technical terms.

The following partner institutions are participating during the third funding phase of TextGrid:
 Berlin-Brandenburg Academy of Sciences and Humanities, Berlin 
 DAASI International GmbH, Tübingen
 University of Applied Sciences Worms, Faculty of Computer Sciences
 University of Göttingen, Göttingen State and University Library (project management)
 Gesellschaft für wissenschaftliche Datenverarbeitung mbH Göttingen
 Institut für Deutsche Sprache, Mannheim 
 University of Würzburg
 Max Planck Institute for the History of Science, Berlin 
 Berlin Institute of Technology
 Technische Universität Darmstadt, Department for Literary Studies

Software 

Scholars from humanities and cultural studies can do their research on textbased data jointly or alone by using the TextGrid software. This   environment consists of two main components: 
 The TextGrid Repository is long-term storage of subject specific contents where digital research data can be stored. This is to guarantee the long-term availability  and access to data and also to provide cooperation for the scholars. 
 The TextGrid Laboratory is the client software of the virtual research environment and combines diverse services and tools within the interface that can be used intuitively. The TextGridLab can be extended and therefore be used by scholars from diverse fields of research and interest. The software is available for all prevalent operation systems.

Further services 

User of TextGrid are able to contact the developers of the software and further involved persons. For this purpose there are different open mailing-lists available. Furthermore, user meetings are arranged on a regular basis and training courses and workshops are offered.

User projects  

Meanwhile, a number of user cases and edition projects which are working with TextGrid are established. More information on these projects and their experiences with TextGrid can be found on the TextGrid Homepage.

Literature 

 TextGrid. In: Heike Neuroth, Martina Kerzel, Wolfgang Gentzsch (Hrsg.): Die D-Grid Initiative. Universitätsverlag Göttingen, Göttingen 2007, S. 64–66.
 Heike Neuroth, Felix Lohmeier, Kathleen Marie Smith: TextGrid. Virtual Research Environment for the Humanities. In: The International Journal of Digital Curation. 6, Nr. 2, 2011, S. 222–231.

External links 
 Official Website of the TextGrid project
 TextGrid user manual
 TextGrid documentation for developers

Itemization 

Research institutes in Germany